This article lists embassies and consulates posted in Spain. At present, the capital city of Madrid hosts 124 embassies, and many countries maintain consulates in other Spanish cities (not including honorary consulates).

Diplomatic missions in Madrid

Embassies

Other delegations or missions 
 (Diplomatic Mission)
 (Representative Office)
 (Taipei Economic and Cultural Office in Spain)

Consular missions

A Coruña, Galicia 
 (Consulate-General)

Algeciras, Andalusia 
 (Consulate-General)

Alicante, Valencian Community 
 (Consulate-General)
 (Consulate)
 (Consulate)

Almería, Andalusia 
 (Consulate-General)
 (Consulate)

Barcelona, Catalonia

Bilbao, Basque Country 

 (Consulate)
 (Consulate)
 (Consulate-General)
 (Consulate-General)
 (Consulate-General)
 (Consulate-General)
 (Consulate-General)

Cádiz, Andalusia 
 (Consulate)

Castellón de la Plana, Valencian Community 
 (Consulate)

Ciudad Real, Castilla-La Mancha 
 (Consulate)

Girona, Catalonia 
 (Consulate-General)

Ibiza, Balearic Islands 
 (Consulate)

Las Palmas, Canary Islands 

 (Consulate)
 (Consulate-General)
 (Consulate)
 (Consulate)
 (Consulate)
 (Consulate)
 (Consulate-General)
 (Consulate-General)
 (Consulate-General)
 Consular Office
 (Consulate)
 (Consular agency)
 (Consulate-General)

Málaga, Andalusia 

 (Consulate-General)
 (Consulate)
 (Consulate-General)
 (Consulate-General)
 (Consulate-General)
 Consulate
 (Consulate)
 (Consular agency)

Murcia, Region of Murcia 
 (Consulate)
 (Consulate-General)
 (Consulate-General)

Palma de Mallorca, Balearic Islands 

 (Consulate)
 Vice-Consulate
 (Consulate)
 (Consulate)
 (Consulate)
 (Consular agency)

Santa Cruz de Tenerife, Canary Islands 

 (Consulate)
 (Consulate)
 (Consulate-General)
 (Consulate)
 (Consulate-General)

Santiago de Compostela, Galicia 
 (Consulate-General)
 (Consulate-General)

Seville, Andalusia 

 (Consulate)
 (Consulate-General)
 (Consulate-General)
 (Consulate)
 (Consulate-General)
 (Consulate-General)
 (Consulate-General)
 (Consulate-General)
 (Consulate-General)
 (Consulate-General)
 (Consular agency)

Tarragona, Catalonia 
 (Consulate-General)

Valencia, Valencian Community 

 (Consulate)
 (Consulate-General)
 (Consulate)
 (Consulate)
 (Consulate-General)
 (Consulate)
 (Consulate-General)
 (Consulate-General)
 (Consulate-General)
 (Consular agency)
 (Consulate-General)

Vigo, Galicia 
 (Consulate-General)
 (Consulate-General)
 (Consulate-General)

Zaragoza, Aragon 
 (Consulate)

Accredited embassies 
Resident in Paris unless otherwise noted

 (London)
 (Brussels)
 (Brussels)

 (Brussels)
 (London)

 (London)

 (London)

 (Brussels)

 (Brussels)

 (London)

 (London)
 (London)

 (New York City)

 (Brussels)
 (New York City)

 (Brussels)
 (Lisbon)
 (London)
 (London)
 (London)
 (London)

 (Brussels)
 (Berlin)
 (Geneva)

 (Lisbon)
 (Brussels)

Closed missions

See also 
 Foreign relations of Spain
 List of diplomatic missions of Spain
 List of diplomatic missions in Madrid
 Visa requirements for Spanish citizens

References

External links 
 Spanish Ministry of Foreign Affairs (Spanish)
 Accredited embassies in Spain

List
Spain
Diplomatic missions